Mingay is an islet in the Inner Hebrides off Skye and Isay.

Together with Isay and Loch Dunvegan, it is designated as a Special Area of Conservation owing to the breeding colonies of the common seal.

Geography and geology
The island's rock is basaltic lava with shale and quartzite.

Mingay is in eastern part of Loch Dunvegan. It is due south of Ardmore Point and west of Waternish, both on Skye. It also looks south to the Skye mountain Beinn Bhreac, and to the south east, Sgeir nam Biast.

History
The island's name is Old Norse in origin, which is in turn the origin of many of the placenames on nearby Skye, as well as the name of Isay, and the neighbouring Clett (Scottish Gaelic: Cleit from Old Norse klettr, meaning a rock.)

See also

 List of islands of Scotland

References

External links

Islands of Highland (council area)
Skye and Lochalsh